Ōka, Ohka,  or  may refer to:

 , blossom of cherry tree
 , a Japanese kamikaze aircraft in World War II
 , a railway station
 , a Japanese surname

See also 
 Oka (disambiguation)
 Ōoka (disambiguation)
 Sakura (disambiguation)
 Cherry Blossom (disambiguation)